Stompin' Grounds is the fourth studio album released by the American country rock/southern rock band The Kentucky Headhunters. It was the first album to feature Doug Phelps on lead vocals. He had rejoined the band after leaving Brother Phelps, a duo founded by him and his brother Ricky Lee, who was originally their lead vocalist. The only single from it was a cover of Guy Mitchell's "Singin' the Blues".

Track listing

Personnel
The Kentucky Headhunters
Greg Martin - electric guitar, slide guitar
Doug Phelps - lead vocals, harmony vocals, rhythm guitar
Fred Young - drums, percussion
Richard Young - rhythm guitar
Anthony Kenney – bass guitar, background vocals
Guest musicians
Rich Ripani - piano on "Singing the Blues" and Hammond B-3 organ on "Mr. Know-It-All"
David Barrick - shaker on "Cowboy Best"

References

1997 albums
The Kentucky Headhunters albums
BNA Records albums